Mifflin Emlen Bell (October 20, 1847 – May 31, 1904), often known as M.E. Bell, was an American architect who served from 1883 to 1886 as Supervising Architect of the US Treasury Department. Bell delegated design responsibilities to staff members, which resulted in a large variety of building styles, including Second Empire, Châteauesque, Queen Anne and Richardsonian Romanesque.

Life and career
Bell was born on a farm in East Bradford Township, Chester County, Pennsylvania to Chalhly Bell & Mary Emlen. He married Addie Vanhoff on June 7, 1871, and by 1876 he was living in Springfield, Illinois with his wife and two children, working as Assistant Superintendent of the statehouse.  Bell's tenure as Supervising Architect for the US Treasury began on November 1, 1883, with an annual salary of $4,500 (equivalent to $ today). He was member of the Joint Commission to Complete the Washington Monument, and his name is engraved on the north face of the monument's capstone. Bell submitted his resignation from the position by mid-1887 and moved to Chicago.  In Chicago, Bell was appointed as superintendent of repairs for the city's federal buildings, and was in charge of federal buildings at the 1893 World's Columbian Exposition.  He died in Chicago of pneumonia in 1904.

Many of his works survive and a number of these are listed on the U.S. National Register of Historic Places (NRHP).

Works
 1884 —  U.S. Custom House and Post Office, Albany, New York 
 1885 —  U.S. Custom House, Court House, and Post Office, Memphis, Tennessee 
1885-89 Federal Building, N. Fitzhugh and Church Sts. Rochester, New York.  Architects Harvey and Charles Ellis are credited with the design;  M.E. Bell was supervising architect during its 1885-9 construction. NRHP-listed.
 1886-87 —  U.S. Post Office, Lexington Kentucky
 1887 —  U.S. Post Office and Court House, Quincy, Illinois 
 1887 —  U.S. Court House and Post Office, Frankfort, Kentucky 
 1887 —  U.S. Court House and Post Office, Greensboro, North Carolina 
 1888 —  U.S. Post Office, Hannibal, Missouri
 1888 —  U.S. Custom House and Post Office, Toledo, Ohio 
 1888 —  U.S. Court House and Post Office, Council Bluffs, Iowa 
 1888 —  U.S. Court House and Post Office, Dallas, Texas 
 1888 —  United States Post Office and Court House, Aberdeen, Mississippi 
 1889 —  U.S. Post Office and Court House, Peoria, Illinois 
 1889 —  U.S. Post Office, Minneapolis, Minnesota 
 1889 — U.S. Court House and Post Office, Jefferson City, Missouri 
 1889 —  U.S. Court House and Post Office, Tyler, Texas 
 1889 —  U.S. Court House and Post Office, Syracuse, New York 
 1889 —  U.S. Court House and Post Office, Macon, Georgia 
 1890 — U.S. Court House and Post Office, Augusta, Maine, NRHP-listed
 1890 —  U.S. Court House and Post Office, Keokuk, Iowa, NRHP-listed 
 1890 —  U.S. Post Office and Court House, Auburn, New York 
 1890 — U.S. Court House and Post Office, Fort Scott, Kansas 
 1888-1891 —  U.S. Court House and Post Office (Carson City), Carson City, Nevada, Richardsonian Romanesque, NRHP-listed.
 1892 —  U.S. Court House and Post Office, Denver, Colorado 
 1892 —  U.S. Post Office, Brooklyn, New York 
 1893 —  U.S. Court House and Post Office, Louisville, Kentucky 
 1895 — Monroe County Courthouse, Sparta, Wisconsin, NRHP-listed
 1896 — DuPage County Courthouse, Wheaton, Illinois
 1896 — Marion County Courthouse, Main St. Knoxville, Iowa, NRHP-listed
Mercer County Courthouse, SE 3rd St. (IL 17) Aledo, Illinois, NRHP-listed
U.S. Post Office, 202 S. 8th St. Nebraska City, Nebraska, NRHP-listed
US Customs House and Post Office, 223 Palafox Pl. Pensacola, Florida, NRHP-listed
U.S. Post Office – Port Townsend Main, 1322 Washington Port Townsend, Washington, NRHP-listed
 U.S. Court House and Post Office, Clarksburg, West Virginia
 U.S. Court House and Post Office, Marquette, Michigan
 U.S. Post Office, Terre Haute, Indiana
 U.S. Court House and Post Office, New Albany, Indiana
 1897 - Nichols Library, Naperville, Illinois

Gallery of designs

References

External links
1881 bio
1883 NYT article

1847 births
1904 deaths
19th-century American architects
People from Chester County, Pennsylvania
Architects from Pennsylvania
Deaths from pneumonia in Illinois